The Cyprus International in badminton is an international open held in Cyprus since 1987. The tournament belongs to the EBU Circuit. The Cypriot National Badminton Championships started three years later.

Winners

Performances by countries

External links

Results
BWF: 2006 results
TournamentSoftware: 2007 results

General
Cyprus Badminton

Badminton tournaments
Badminton tournaments in Cyprus
Sports competitions in Cyprus
Recurring sporting events established in 1987
1987 establishments in Cyprus